The 1997 MAC men's basketball tournament, a part of the 1996–97 NCAA Division I men's basketball season, took place at SeaGate Centre in Toledo, Ohio. Its winner received the Mid-American Conference's automatic bid to the 1997 NCAA tournament. It was a single-elimination tournament with three rounds and the top eight MAC teams invited to participate. No teams received byes in the tournament. Bowling Green received the number one seed in the tournament.

Tournament

Seeds
 Bowling Green
 Miami
 Ohio
 Eastern Michigan
 Ball State
 Western Michigan
 Kent State
 Toledo

Bracket 

* Overtime period

References 

Tournament
Mid-American Conference men's basketball tournament
MAC men's basketball tournament